Catoira is a municipality in Galicia, Spain, located in the province of Pontevedra. Catoira is famous for its ruins of the Torres do Oeste (Towers of the West).

Demography

Local festivals
The most important celebrations include:
the Viking Festival of Catoira, held on the first Sunday in August (Declared of International Tourist Interest),
the Supervisory Celebrations 
Feast day of Saint Anthony of Padua, held on the second Sunday in July, during which the famous Gastronomical Celebration "da Solla" is celebrated.  The local parishes have (during the summer) their own celebrations.
The most important of these is the Festa da parroquia de Oeste, or Festas de Santabaia, on the second weekend in August.  There are also very important celebrations in honor of San Antonio de Dimo (the first Sunday in July)

References

External links
Official website
Official web site of the San Antonio Society
Official web about viking festival of Catoira
Canoeing club "As Torres"
Ateneo vikingo

Municipalities in the Province of Pontevedra